Emergency Skin is a science-fiction novelette written by N. K. Jemisin.  The story was first published by Amazon Original Stories as part of the Forward short fiction collection in September 2019.  The story was well received, and it was awarded a Hugo Award, an Audie Award (for the audiobook), and an Ignyte Award in 2020.

Plot
The unnamed protagonist lives on an exoplanet colony that was founded when the collapse of life on Earth (called Tellus in the story) was deemed inevitable. He, like all other lower-class people in the colony, has a synthetic body rather than skin, which is reserved for the colony's "Founders" and other elite. Aided by a collective AI implanted in his brain, he is sent on a mission to Tellus to retrieve cell cultures that the Founders need to continue synthesizing skin. However, when he arrives there, he discovers that it is not the lifeless husk he was led to believe, and that he is far from the first of his kind to come there on a cell culture mission. Instead of returning to his ship with the cells, he activates his "emergency skin," a layer of nanites that form synthetic skin, and stays on Earth to learn more. An old man brings him to a museum and shows him what happened after the Founders left the planet to form their colony: everyone left on Earth abandoned country borders and individual property, pooling all their resources and working together to prevent the planet's destruction. The protagonist realizes that the Founders deliberately kept this information from everyone else on the colony so that they could continue to hoard resources as the elite, and that they kill everyone who returns from missions to Earth so that they cannot tell anyone the truth. The story ends with him disabling the collective AI in his brain and resolving to return to his colony to start a revolution against the Founders.

Reception 
Kirkus Reviews called it a subversive story that "shatters all expectations".
AudioFile reviewer Emily Connelly found that the brief story cleverly conveyed both alarm and curiosity as to how the thriving society story could sustain itself.  She also praised the audio performance of Jason Isaacs for immersing listeners in the story as if they were on the mission as well, giving it an Earphone Award for the month. The story was later collected in The Year’s Best Science Fiction, Vol 1: The Saga Anthology of Science Fiction 2020 as well, where Publishers Weekly highlighted it as a standout of the "year's best" anthology.

Accolades 
In 2020, Emergency Skin received the following awards and nominations:

References 

2019 short stories
Hugo Award for Best Novelette winning works
Science fiction short stories
Works by N. K. Jemisin